Eugenia Ravasio (4 September 1907 – 10 August 1990), born Eugenia Elisabetta Ravasio, was a Roman Catholic nun of the Congregation of the Missionary Sisters of Our Lady of the Apostles and an Italian mystic, best known for having discovered the cure for leprosy and for having received unprecedented visions and revelations from God the Father.

Early life 
Eugenia Elisabetta Ravasio was born in San Gervasio d’Adda (named now Capriate San Gervasio), a small town in the province of Bergamo, Italy, on 4 September 1907, in a family of peasant background.

She received only an elementary education. After a few years working in a factory, she entered the Congregation of the Missionary Sisters of Our Lady of the Apostles at the age of 20 years. It was here that her great charismatic personality developed, leading to her election as Mother General of the Congregation at age 28.

Social and apostolic work 
Ravasio performed significant amounts of work in the social field. In twelve years of missionary activity she opened over 70 centres – each with infirmary, school and church – in the remotest spots of Africa, Asia and Europe.

In or around 1936, she was invited by Tanios Toni Kawas (a prominent cotton field LandLord), son of Antoun Abdel Sayed Kawas (mayor of Girga, Egypt), to open the Lady of the Apostles school in Girga, Egypt. The school is still in operation even today. Tanios Toni Kawas having 6 young girls and no schools for them, invited many religious congregations, but only Ravasio responded to his request.

As part of her work with lepers on the Ivory Coast she was instrumental in promoting and popularizing the use of chemotherapy for the cure of leprosy, by orally administering chaulmoogra oil which was extracted from the seed of a tropical plant. This medicine was later studied and developed further at the Pasteur Institute in Paris.

She encouraged the apostolate of Raoul Follereau, who, following in her footsteps and building on the foundations laid by her, is regarded as the apostle of the lepers.

During the period 1939–1941 she conceived, planned and brought to fruition the project for a "Lepers’ City" at Adzopé (Ivory Coast). This was a vast centre, covering an area of 200,000 m2, for the care of leprosy sufferers. It remains even today one of Africa's and the world's leading centres of its kind.

In recognition of this achievement, France conferred the Couronne Civique, the highest national honour for social work, on the Congregation of the Missionary Sisters of Our Lady of the Apostles, of which Ravasio was Superior General from 1935 to 1947.

God the Father revelations 

Ravasio reported a series of messages from God the Father, which were published as "The Father speaks to His children". The Bishop of Grenoble (who was mentioned in the messages) recognized these messages as authentic after ten years of examination. However, the Vatican has neither approved nor disapproved of these messages, and Catholics are not required to believe them. To date these are the only reported private revelations from God the Father that have been approved by a bishop.

In her book, Ravasio wrote that she personally saw God the Father and that God the Father sat next to her. On 1 July 1932, in Book 1, part 1, she quoted God the Father and wrote:
... "Look, I put aside my crown and all my glory to take the attitude of the common person"... After having taken the attitude of a common person, placing his crown and glory at his feet, he took the globe of the world to his heart. Supporting it with his left hand, then he
sat down next to me...

Ravasio also wrote messages from God the Father to Bishop Alexandre Caillot, who later approved of the book. In Book 1, part 3 she wrote:
"I also want to say a word to you, My son Alexander, so that My desires may be realized in the world. You must join with the father confessor of this “little plant” (Mother Eugenia) of My Son Jesus, in promoting this work"

Ravasio also wrote of acts by the Devil. On 12 August 1932 she wrote that the Devil took the book and slashed its covers with a pair of scissors. On that day she also wrote of a new path to salvation and quoted God the Father as follows:
"ALL THOSE WHO CALL ME BY THE NAME OF FATHER, EVEN IF ONLY ONCE, WILL NOT PERISH, BUT WILL BE SURE OF THEIR ETERNAL LIFE AMONG THE CHOSEN ONES."

Church approval and controversies 
Ravasio's messages were approved by Bishop Alexander Caillot of Grenoble, who was mentioned in the messages. Caillot ordered an investigation, and after ten years issued a letter stating that the messages had a divine nature. In 1988 the messages received the imprimatur of Cardinal Petrus Canisius Van Lierde, Vicar General for the Vatican City State, whose general duties were the administration of daily functions of Vatican City. The imprimatur signified that in the Cardinal's opinion the messages contain nothing against faith and morals, but not certifying that the messages were received from God the Father. The first official authority for determining the authenticity of a private revelation is the local bishop. However, the case may be sent to the Congregation for the Doctrine of the Faith (CDF) at the Holy See, which is a higher authority. In the case of Ravasio's messages, the CDF has not issued an opinion on them.

As in all other private revelations, Catholics in general are not required to believe the messages of Ravasio. The decision as to whether or not to believe in an approved private revelation is left to the conscience of each individual Catholic.

The Roman Catholic Church did not declare her writings heresy, so this is not a controversy in the Church. Two bishops provided imprimaturs which state their opinion that the writings are of no danger to faith and morals.

Works 
 Mother Eugenia Ravasio; The Father speaks to His children. Rome, 1989.

See also 

 Mystical Rose

References

External links 

 The Father's message to Mother Eugenia Ravasio
 Mother Eugenia Ravasio and the Message from God the Father 
 "The Father speaks to His children" (in PDF format to download)
 Biography of Mother Eugenia Ravasio (in PDF format to download)
 / God The Father Medals and Mother Eugenia Topics

1907 births
1990 deaths
20th-century Christian mystics
People from Capriate San Gervasio
20th-century Italian Roman Catholic religious sisters and nuns
Roman Catholic mystics